Cydosia nobilitella, the curve-lined cydosia moth or regal cydosia moth, is a moth of the family Noctuidae. The species was first described by Pieter Cramer in 1779. It is found from southern Florida south to Argentina. It is also found on the Antilles.

The wingspan is 20–25 mm

The larvae have been recorded feeding on Spigelia anthelmia.

References

Moths described in 1779
Acontiinae
Moths of North America
Moths of Central America
Moths of South America